Masters of Turkish Music is a compilation album released by Rounder Records in 1990. The record features 20 tracks of Turkish classical music, compiled and restored from the 78s recorded between 1906 and 1949.

Critical reception

AllMusic critic Richie Unterberger gave a rave review to the album, stating: "The taksim (improvisations) and gazels (vocal improvisations) are extremely emotional and moving, and there is a good deal of variety in the 75-minute program, in both content and instrumentation." Unterberger also praised the sound and audio restoration on the record, writing that "even on the performances dating back to the early 20th century, the transfers seem to be clear as technology will allow."

Track listing

Personnel
Album personnel as adapted from liner notes.

 Ercüment G. Aksoy — assistant, liner notes
 Munir Nurettin Beken — assistant, liner notes
 Nancy Given — design
 Talat Halman — liner notes
 Karl Signell — liner notes
 Richard K. Spottswood — disc sources, liner notes
 Hugo Strötbaum — photography
 Jack Towers — restoration
 Necdet Yaşar — assistant, liner notes

References

External links
 

1990 compilation albums
Rounder Records compilation albums
Classical albums by Turkish artists